is a Japanese noise and free improvisation group with a revolving lineup that has ranged from two members to as many as fourteen in its early days. The group is the project of guitarist , its one constant member, who is head and owner of the Osaka-based Alchemy Records. Other regulars include Jojo's wife Junko and Toshiji Mikawa (also of Incapacitants).

The group began at the very end of the 1970s as a performance art-based group whose anarchic shows would often involve destruction of venues and audio equipment, food and garbage being thrown around, and on-stage urination. As the group's lineup changed over time, their focus became less performance-based and more musically based, fine-tuning their sound into a dense wall of noise.

History

Pre-Hijōkaidan
They played an improvised session at a studio with fellow Rasenkaidan member  (a.k.a. Idiot) in attendance. Afterwards, Takayama said "This is not , it is more like ."

This Hijōkaidan played live twice and recorded a few studio sessions. Recordings of this line-up were later released as Original Hijōkaidan or Pre-Hijōkaidan. At the end of the year, Zushi left, and Jojo decided to quit all of his musical projects (Hijōkaidan, Rasenkaidan, and Ultra Bidet). Idiot and Zushi briefly continued Rasenkaidan, and Idiot later formed Idiot O'Clock.

Corroded Marie
In the spring of 1980, Jojo formed a new group called  to play songs in the style of Hawkwind. Initial members were Jojo,  (a.k.a. Oka), Katsuhiro Nakajima (a.k.a. Zuke), Masako Shigesugi (a.k.a. Mako),  (a.k.a. Zushi declined to take part. The practice sessions devolved into improvised noise, and Jojo considered disbanding the group, but was convinced otherwise by Oka, Zuke, and Ichiguchi.

By mistake, they were billed as Hijōkaidan, Jojo decided to keep the name. After the show Mako left. Disappointed that they didn't play songs or like Hawkwind, Jojo again thought about disbanding the group. He listened to a cassette of the performance repeatedly, and began to consider the possibility of releasing it. In August he met , who had started an independent label called Unbalance Records, and made a deal to release the show. He contacted Zuke and Oka about releasing the show and asked if they wanted to continue the group. Jojo discovered that they were thinking about continuing as a new group without him.

On November 3, the regrouped Hijōkaidan played at Sōzōdōjō in Osaka. The show started with a cover of "It's a Rainy Day, Sunshine Girl" by Faust, before turning into free-form noise. This show is also the beginning of the performance art aspect of Hijōkaidan's live show, with Zuke throwing around takoyaki.

The ACB show was released as one side of a split LP called  in December 1980 by Unbalance, the other side had tracks by NG and Jurajium. The track was called  in honor of their original name.

Alchemy Records
Alchemy Records is a record label based in Osaka, Japan, specializing in noise / experimental music and psychedelic rock.  It is run by Jojo Hiroshige of the noise group Hijokaidan.  Alchemy has released albums by Hijokaidan, Balzac, Hanatarash, Masonna, Incapacitants, Borbetomagus, and Merzbow, among many others. Until April 2008, Alchemy also had a record store in Osaka's Amerikamura.

Discography

References

External links
非常階段 at Teichiku Records (in Japanese)

Japanese rock music groups
Noise musical groups
Musical groups from Kyoto Prefecture